Mikhail Semyonovich Agranovich (January 4, 1931, Moscow – February 14, 2017) was a Russian mathematician working on partial differential equations who introduced the Agranovich–Dynin formula.

References

External links

1931 births
2017 deaths
Mathematicians from Moscow
Soviet mathematicians
Moscow State University alumni